This is a list of episodes from the second season of Mannix.

Broadcast history
The season originally aired Saturdays at 10:00-11:00 pm (EST).

DVD release
The season was released on DVD by Paramount Home Video.

Episodes

References

Mannix seasons